Edward C. Whiting  (1860 in Philadelphia – ???), was a professional baseball player who played catcher in the Major Leagues from  to . He would play for the Baltimore Orioles and Louisville Eclipse. He was the uncle of Jesse Whiting.

External links

1860 births
Year of death missing
Major League Baseball catchers
Baltimore Orioles (AA) players
Louisville Eclipse players
19th-century baseball players
Minor league baseball managers
York White Roses players
Columbus Stars (baseball) players
Providence Grays (minor league) players
Philadelphia Athletics (minor league) players
Macon (minor league baseball) players
Baseball players from Pennsylvania